So Much Better is the third album by American R&B singer Carl Thomas. It was released by Bungalo Records on June 5, 2007 in the United States. The album marked  Thomas's debut release with the label following his departure from Bad Boy Records after the release of his second album Let's Talk About It (2004). The singer reteamed with frequent collaborator Mike City to work on the majority of So Much Better. Distribution of the album was overseen by Universal Records.

The album debuted at number 25 on the US Billboard 200, selling about 28,000 copies in its first week. The cover for So Much Better was photographed by former rapper D-Nice while the A&R overseeing the project were Hakim Green and Vincent "Tuffy" Morgan, members of the mid-1990s hip hop group Channel Live.

Track listing 

Notes and sample credits
 denotes co-producer

Personnel

 Drum Programming and Keyboards: Mike City, A. Jermaine Mobley, Jimmy Jam, James "Big Jim" Wright
 Drums: Isaiah "IZ" Avila
 Guitar: Natural, Erik Walls, Donald "Pup Dawg"
 Background vocals: Mike City, Lalah Hathaway, Brandy, Claude Kelly, Gordon Chambers, Di Reed
 Recording and mixing engineers: Francis "Franchise" Graham, Matt Marrin, Titanic Tracks, Troy Taylor, Jeff Jones, Sam Waters, Vincent "Tuffy" Morgan

 Executive producer: Carl Thomas, Mike City, Jheryl Busby
 Mastering: Gene Grimaldi
 A&R direction: Hakim Green, Vincent "Tuffy" Morgan
 Photography: Derrick "D-Nice" Jones, Parrish Lewis
 Art direction & design: Rab Butler

Charts

Weekly charts

References

2007 albums
Carl Thomas (singer) albums
Albums produced by Bryan-Michael Cox
Albums produced by Jimmy Jam and Terry Lewis